Gilindire Cave, also known as Aynalıgöl Cave, is a cave in Aydıncık, Mersin, southern Turkey. It was discovered by a shepherd in 1999. Gilindire was the former name of the town Aydıncık until 1965.

Location and access
Its entrance faces the Mediterranean Sea, and a small village lies in front of the cave. The cave is accessible by sea via a -hour boat trip from Aydıncık, or by land via a 15–minute walk from the Antalya-Mersin highway. A steel stairway leads down to the cave's entrance from above.

Description
It is a horizontally-developed, polygenic-fossilized cave.

The cave features a wealth of stalagmites, stalactites, as well as "pillar, wall and drapery dripstones, leakage stones and cave needles" which divide the interior into many chambers. The cave is called Aynalıgöl (literally: Mirror Lake) in common parlance, in reference to the presence of the lake.

Some parts of the cave's main gallery are inhabited by bats. Outside the cave, the nearby bays are the habitat of the Mediterranean monk seal.

Exploration
Gilindire Cave was discovered by a shepherd in 1999. When the state-owned Mineral Research and Exploration Co. (MTA) undertook exploration works in the cave, they discovered the lake at the end of the cave,  from the entrance. In 2002, two Turkish photographers came to the cave by sea, and took photos for the magazine Atlas both in the cave and underwater in the lake. Archaeologists found potsherds in the cave belonging to the New Stone Age, Copper Age, and Early Bronze Age periods.

According to a survey by experts, the cave was formed in the beginning of the transition phase after the last glacial climate change of the Quaternary Period, when the Mediterranean Sea rose , flooding the bottom of the cave. The change in the hydrological regime helped preserve the cave formations such as stalagmites and stalactites. Due to being under water, they have remained unaffected by atmospheric changes to the present day.

In 2013, Gilindire Cave was designated a nature reserve by the Ministry of Forest and Water Management.  It was opened to the public, and has become a tourist attraction.

References

External links

 Official website:
https://www.gilindiremagarasi.com/

Show caves in Turkey
Nature parks in Turkey
Landforms of Mersin Province
Tourist attractions in Mersin Province
Aydıncık District (Mersin)
Protected areas of Turkey
Protected areas established in 2013
2013 establishments in Turkey